The Kazakhstan National Respiratory Society founded in 1985 works with the Central-Asian Pulmonologists Association and the Euro-Asian Respiratory Society.  The society is maintained by the Ministry of Health of the Republic of Kazakhstan.

See also
European Sleep Apnea Database

Pulmonology and respiratory therapy organizations
Medical and health organizations based in Kazakhstan